Alon Goshen-Gottstein (Hebrew: אלון גושן גוטשטיין) (born 1956, England) is a scholar of Jewish studies and a theoretician and activist in the domain of interfaith dialogue. He is founder and director of the Elijah Interfaith Institute since 1997. He specializes in bridging the theological and academic dimension with a variety of practical initiatives, especially involving world religious leadership.

Personal life 
Goshen-Gottstein is the son of Moshe Goshen-Gottstein – a professor of Jewish studies, linguist, Bible scholar, and theologian – and Esther Goshen-Gottstein, a clinical psychologist. The Jerusalem home in which Goshen-Gottstein grew up was open to students of various religions, as well as to visiting clergy.

Goshen-Gottstein is married to Therese (born Andrevon), who is a close collaborator in his interfaith activities. Goshen-Gottstein has two sons, Elisha and Nerya.

Education and academic career 

Goshen-Gottstein underwent religious training and was ordained a rabbi in 1978. For the following thirty years he served as a reserve chaplain in the Israeli army, but he has never practiced as a communal rabbi.

Goshen-Gottstein attended Hebrew University of Jerusalem with a concentration in the fields of Talmud and Jewish Thought. He also studied at Harvard University Christianity and religions. He received a PhD from Hebrew University in Jerusalem in 1986. His thesis was on the subject "God and Israel as Father and Son in Tannaitic Literature. His PhD was supervised by Ephraim Urbach. He has taught at a variety of Israeli universities. Goshen-Gottstein headed the Institute for the Study of Rabbinic, taught at Bet Morasha College, Jerusalem, from 1997 till 2013, and oversaw conferences and publications in the field.

For a decade Goshen-Gottstein was a member of the Shalom Hartman Institute of Advanced Studies. Here, he engaged with contemporary existential issues and became versed in public interfaith conversations, for which he was in charge for several years on behalf of the Hartman Institute.

Besides his academic training, Goshen-Gottstein has drawn from other Jewish and non-Jewish resources. He is affiliated with several Hassidic communities and has been deeply influenced by Hassidic teaching and spirituality. He has also published in that area.

Interfaith work

Goshen-Gottstein's spiritual education has included formative relations with non-Jewish spiritual masters and in–depth relations with a broad range of Christian monastic communities. He has shared in the spiritual lives of Christian and Hindu communities and enjoyed the friendship, wisdom, and counsel of teachers from the Buddhist and Muslim traditions.

His personal experience led him to found in 1997 the Elijah Interfaith Institute, initially as a consortium of 13 Jerusalem-based academic theological schools. The Institute evolved into a global gathering of premier religious figures (Elijah Board of World Religious Leaders) and scholars. Goshen-Gottstein's personal foundations in the field of religious leadership and academic training equipped him to moderate processes of learning and broader public engagement, involving leaders and scholars. His own interest in spirituality across religions and his extensive network of personal relationships have shaped some of the Elijah Institute's unique programming, leading to research and publication on areas such as "Religious Genius" (study of saints and exceptional individual across religions); Friendship Across Religions, and the study of mystical and spiritual life.

His ability to negotiate religious leadership and academic scholarship and to make them address broader publics with novel insights and approaches has made him a voice on global issues related to relations between religions. He has appeared on multiple television shows in different countries, and has published op-ed pieces in different publications and in multiple languages, in addition to his own blogs.

His contribution to the interreligious field was recognized by the Polish Council of Christians and Jews, that conferred upon him the title "Figure of Reconciliation."

Publications 
 Goshen-Gottstein, Alon, ed. (2022) | Judaism and Hinduism Contemporary Jewry (vol. 41,3)
 
 
 
 
 
 Goshen-Gottstein, Alon (2018) Luther the Anti-Semite: A Contemporary Jewish Perspective. Fortress Press. 2018
 Goshen-Gottstein, Alon (Ed.) (2018), Rabbinic Thought: Shifting Ideals and Values in Dialogue with Scripture and Tradition, Da'at 86, 2018, Bar Ilan University Press (Hebrew)
 
 
 
 
 
 
 
 
 
 
 Goshen-Gottstein, Alon and Reis Habito, Maria (2008). Die Krise Des Heiligen Herausgegeben (German). EOS. 2008
 Goshen-Gottstein, Alon (2000). The Sinner and the Amnesiac: The Rabbinic Invention of Elisha ben Abuya and Eleazar ben Arach. Palo Alto: Stanford University Press. 2000.

Musical career
Alongside his academic and interfaith work, Goshen-Gottstein has also recorded hasidic music. His work has been released on the Italian label Amiata Records.

References

External links
The Elijah Interfaith Institute
Academia page
Lexington Interreligious Reflections
 Times of Israel blog
 The Huffington Post blog

1956 births
Israeli Orthodox rabbis
20th-century Israeli rabbis
21st-century Israeli rabbis
Israeli academics
Living people
English Orthodox Jews